An incomplete list of events in 1287 in Italy:
 The naval Battle of the Counts

Births
 Robert III of Artois (1287–1342)

Deaths
 Honorius IV (1210–1287)

References

Italy
Italy
Years of the 13th century in Italy